The Horniman Circle Gardens is a large park in South Mumbai, India, which encompasses an area of 2½ acres (10,100 m²). It is situated in the Fort district of Mumbai, and is surrounded by office complexes housing the country's premier banks. Designed to be a large open space with grand buildings in the middle of the walled city, the area had been known as Bombay Green in the 18th century, while the Elphinstone. Following India's independence in 1947, the area was renamed in honour of Benjamin Horniman, editor of The Bombay Chronicle newspaper, who supported Indian independence.

History

The building was begun in 1821 and not completed for twelve years. In 1842, the area had been just a dump of coconut shells and debris. The Police Commissioner, Charles Forjett, thought of converting the Green into a circle surrounded by buildings. He was supported by governors Lord Elphinstone and Sir Bartle Frère. The garden was planned in 1869 and completed in 1872 with well laid out walkways and trees planted all around. An ornamental fountain was placed in the centre, but it was replaced by a modern art deco iron pipes design.

The park was a favourite social venue of the Parsi community. In the pre-independence era, a band used to perform there every evening.

The Asiatic Society of Mumbai overlooks the Horniman Circle Gardens and the Reserve Bank of India.  Close by, in Nariman Street is St. Thomas Cathedral, the first Anglican church in Mumbai, completed in 1718.

Events
Horniman Circle hosts the annual Sufi and mystic music festival, Ruhaniyat. It is also one of the venues of the Kala Ghoda Arts Festival when several music and dance concerts are held at the park.

References

Further reading
 Kamala Ganesh, Usha Thakkar and Gita Chadha. eds., Zero Point Bombay: In and Around Horniman Circle, Lotus Collection, Roli Books (2008)

External links

 Elphinstone Circle, Bombay, 1870 British Library

Parks in Mumbai
1872 establishments in India